Dongcheon-dong may refer to various places in South Korea:

Dongcheon-dong, Daegu
Dongcheon-dong, Gyeongju
Dongcheon-dong, Yongin